Harry William Lane (born 23 October 1894) was an English professional footballer who played as an inside right in the Football League for West Ham United, Queens Park Rangers and Charlton Athletic.

Personal life 
During the First World War, Lane enlisted as a despatch rider and later became a pilot in the Royal Flying Corps. He achieved a BA in Law after the war.

Career statistics

References

English Football League players
English footballers
Year of death missing
Place of death missing
1894 births
Footballers from Leicestershire
Association football inside forwards
Association football utility players
Hinckley United F.C. players
Nottingham Forest F.C. players
Notts County F.C. players
Ashfield United F.C. players
West Ham United F.C. players
Charlton Athletic F.C. players
Queens Park Rangers F.C. players
British Army personnel of World War I
Royal Flying Corps soldiers
Military personnel from Leicestershire